Polymixis serpentina is a moth of the family Noctuidae. It is found in Italy, the Balkan Peninsula and Crete.

The wingspan is about 36 mm. Adults are on wing from October to November.

The larvae feed on various low-growing plants.

Subspecies
Polymixis serpentina serpentina
Polymixis serpentina minoica Fibiger, 1992 (Crete)

Polymixis iatnana was formerly treated as a subspecies Polymixis serpentina.

References

Moths described in 1825
Cuculliinae
Moths of Europe
Moths of the Middle East